Listen Fundraising was a UK-based telemarketing company that conducts telephone fundraising, mobile fundraising, and legacy fundraising campaigns on behalf of charitable and non-charitable institutions.

History
Listen began operations on December 1, 2008. The company started out as a small operation of three Fundraisers conducting telephone-based fundraising campaigns. It now has two London-based offices calling across the UK and abroad. 

The company has run campaigns for a number of high-profile charities, universities and other organisations in the UK and abroad. It is a Corporate Supporter of the Institute of Fundraising. 

In August 2019, the company announced its closure.

Awards and recognition
Listen Fundraising has gained public recognition for the quality of its work and received the “Best Use of Telephone Award” at the Institute of Fundraising National Awards in both 2012 and 2013.

In December 2013 Listen gained its first awards outside of the charity sector, receiving a Gold award from the Direct Marketing Association (DMA) in the “Best Media Planning” category and a Silver award in the “Best Charity Campaign” category. It also had a Highly Commended campaign at the Third Sector Excellence Awards in September 2013 and was shortlisted for the Best Telephone Fundraising Agency at the Partners in Fundraising Awards in 2014.

References

British companies established in 2008
Charity fundraisers
Business services companies established in 2008
Business services companies of the United Kingdom
Business services companies disestablished in the 21st century